St. Michael's School, Durgapur (established in 1966) is a private Christian missionary English medium co-educational school in the steel city of Durgapur. Adjacent to the St Michael's and All Angel's Cathedral, it is under the Church of North India and follows the Protestant denomination.

About the school
It has about 3500 students studying. It is affiliated to the CISCE (Council for the Indian School Certificate Examinations) board. It is located in Bidhannagar, Durgapur locality of the city. Classes range from Pre-Nursery to Class XII. The school offers science, commerce and humanities as streams in plus two.

See also
Education in India
List of schools in India
Education in West Bengal

References

External links

Church of North India schools
Primary schools in West Bengal
High schools and secondary schools in West Bengal
Christian schools in West Bengal
Schools in Paschim Bardhaman district
Education in Durgapur, West Bengal
Educational institutions established in 1966
1966 establishments in West Bengal